"Just One Time" is a single written and originally recorded by American country music artist Don Gibson. Released in February 1960, the song reached #2 on the Billboard Hot Country Singles chart, while also reaching #29 on the Billboard Pop chart. The single was later released on Gibson's album Look Who's Blue.

In 1971 American country artist Connie Smith recorded a cover version of "Just One Time" and released it as a single in April 1971. The single peaked at #2 on the Billboard Hot Country Singles chart and #19 on the Bubbling Under Hot 100 singles chart. It became her first single in seven years to reach the latter chart. In addition, "Just One Time" reached #2 on the Canadian RPM Country Tracks chart in 1971. It was released on an album of the same name shortly after.

Others recording the song are Skeeter Davis in 1960 (an answer song as “I Want To See You (Just One Time)”), the Everly Brothers in 1963, Johnny Tillotson in 1965, Frank Ifield in 1966, Kitty Wells in 1971, Dottie West in 1971, Jean Shepard in 1971, Danny Davis and the Nashville Brass in 1971, Chet Atkins in 1971, Renée Martel (in French, as "Si on pouvait recommencer") in 1972, Freddy Fender in 1976, Tompall & the Glaser Brothers in 1981, and Chet Atkins and Mark Knopfler in 1990.

Chart performance

Don Gibson

Connie Smith

Tompall & the Glaser Brothers

References

1960 singles
1971 singles
Don Gibson songs
Connie Smith songs
Songs written by Don Gibson
Song recordings produced by Chet Atkins
Song recordings produced by Bob Ferguson (musician)
RCA Victor singles
1960 songs